Sinhan Minbo or The New Korea was a Korean-American newspaper founded on February 10, 1909, by the Korean National Association (KNA). It was based in San Francisco and published weekly. The newspaper became a vital part in promoting nationalism amongst Korean immigrant communities and spreading news on the issue of Korean independence. It would be the most influential and longest lasting newspaper for Korean Immigrants in the US.

History

Nine days after the formal establishment of the KNA on February 1, 1909, the organization launched a newspaper which they would name Sinhan Minbo or The New Korea in English. It would replace the first Korean language paper Konglip Sinbo(The United Korean) and its competing paper, Taedong Kongbo (The New Korean World). As the main organ of the organization, it aimed to revitalize the spirit and commitment of all Korean People towards its goals. It was funded by the Mutual Assistance Society, one of two key organizations that merged to form the KNA. Its publication location was near the KNA's Headquarters in San Francisco, and weekly circulation was approximately 3000, with 700 to 800 distributed throughout the mainland US, 500 to 600 distributed throughout Hawaii, 300 to 400 throughout Mexico, and the rest throughout Siberia and Manchuria. Although it initially influenced readers in some parts of Korea in its first year, it was rarely distributed there after 1910 due to censorship following Japan's annexation of Korea. At its peak, it had 33 outlets, including a sales outlet located in Siberia.

The first publisher and editor was Choi Jung Ik until May 14, 1910, when Lee Hwan-woo took his place. Lee Hwan-woo attempted to establish an English-language column but poor management resulted in Choi Jung-ik taking charge of editing once again. Despite some management issues in its first few years, improvements were made on March 11, 1915, when KNA member Lee Daewi invented the first Korean typesetting machines to print the newspapers.

The title of the newspaper was written on the map of Korea with its name ‘’’Sinhan Minbo’’’ in Chinese characters (Hanja) "新韓民報". In 1925, a new design with Korean letters (Hangul)ㅅㅣㄴㅎㅏㄴㅁㅣㄴㅂㅗ (신한민보)  was developed but only lasted until 1929 when it returned to its original design once again. Like other Korean newspapers of its time, it employed vertical writing and was read from right to left.

The articles between 1910 and World War II were mainly related to Korean liberation, but also included social and political issues of Koreans living abroad.  In its first issue, it explained that as a newspaper for an organization representing all Koreans,  it promises that compared with the previous two Korean language newspapers, it would provide a broader scope of news and impartial views.  In the same year of its establishment, the independence activist Park Yong-man began a year of journalism work there and would publish an article titled "On a Universal
Draft System, " which stressed that military service for Korean liberation was a patriotic duty. Between 1937 and 1946, Sinhan Minbo reserved the fourth page for an English section edited by the Young Korean National Association (YKNA). The articles mainly targeted younger readers, especially second generation Korean Americans. From 1937 to 1940, the independence activist Philip Jaisohn contributed to English columns such as “My Days in Korea” and “Random Thoughts”.

During the year when the March 1st Movement took place, the newspaper began publishing every two days in order to quickly update domestic news to Korean Americans. After that year, it returned to publishing weekly until September 1974, when it was acquired by Kim Un Ha and published monthly in Los Angeles.

See also

History of Korea
Provisional Government of Republic of Korea
Korean independence movement
Korean National Association

References

Bibliography

 Kyu, P. (1996) 신한민보(in Korean). In Encyclopedia of Korean Culture. Retrieved http://encykorea.aks.ac.kr/Contents/Index?contents_id=E0033529
 Gonzalez J., Torrez, J. ( 2012) News for All the People: The Epic Story of Race and the American Media, New York, Verso,177. Print
 서범석 (2017) 신한민보(新韓民報)의 광고에 대한 연구 The Korean Journal Advertising 23(6), 55~71. Retrieved from http://kja.koads.or.kr/article.asp?code=307372&mode=past&year=2017&issue=22833&searchType=&searchValue=&page=1
 Kim, Han. K. (2002). The Korean Independence Movement in the United States. International Journal of Korean Studies, 6(1),1-27. Retrieved from http://icks.org/data/ijks/1482456493_add_file_1.pdf
 신한민보 (n.d.). In ‘’National Institute Of Korean History’’. Retrieved from http://contents.history.go.kr/front/tg/view.do?treeId=0203&levelId=tg_004_1710&ganada=&pageUnit=10 
 Kim, R. (2011)The Quest for Statehood: Korean Immigrant Nationalism and U.S. Sovereignty, 1905–1945. New York, Oxford University Press. 42–43. Print

Newspapers established in 1909
Korean-language newspapers
1909 establishments in the United States
Newspapers published in San Francisco
Korean independence movement
Defunct weekly newspapers
Defunct monthly newspapers
Weekly newspapers published in California